Petr Fiala (born 1 September 1964) is a Czech politician and political scientist who has been the prime minister of the Czech Republic since November 2021 and leader of the Civic Democratic Party (ODS) since 2014. He previously served as the Minister of Education, Youth and Sports from 2012 to 2013. Prior to entering politics, he was the rector of Masaryk University.

Fiala was first elected to the Chamber of Deputies as a non-partisan in the 2013 election. He won the 2014 Civic Democratic Party leadership election, promising to reform the party and regain public trust after the a corruption scandal involving Prime Minister Petr Nečas. Fiala's party finished a distant second place in the 2017 legislative election, and remained in opposition despite multiple offers from the incoming Prime Minister Andrej Babiš to participate in his governing coalition.

In 2020, Fiala led the initiative for a centre-right electoral alliance with KDU-ČSL and TOP 09, known as Spolu. He became its candidate for the premiership in the 2021 Czech legislative election, running on a pro-Western and pro-European centre-right platform, focused on fiscal responsibility and closer relations with NATO as part of Atlanticism. The alliance outperformed initial opinion polls and finished first in the election, though with one less seat in the Chamber of Deputies than second-place ANO 2011.

Under Fiala's leadership, Spolu formed a coalition agreement with the Pirates and Mayors alliance, with a majority of 108 of 200 seats. He was appointed Prime Minister by President Miloš Zeman on 28 November 2021 and Petr Fiala's Cabinet took power on 17 December 2021, making him the third oldest person to hold the office, as well as the first with a political science background and the first from Brno.

Fiala came into office promising to reform and stabilize the government's growing national debt; however, he was forced to respond to the 2022 Russian invasion of Ukraine, providing aid to Ukraine during the Russo-Ukrainian War, and opening the Czech Republic's borders to highest number of Ukrainian refugees per capita in the ensuing Ukrainian refugee crisis. Fiala imposed sanctions against Russia for the invasion of Ukraine and pushed to block Russian citizens from travelling to the European Union. His administration also contended with the 2021–2022 inflation surge, concerns about the economy, and the ongoing global energy crisis. In July 2022, the Czech Republic assumed the presidency of the Council of the European Union.

Early life
Petr Fiala was born in Brno to a conservative Catholic family. His father, who was partly of Jewish origin, was a Holocaust survivor. Fiala studied history and Czech language at the Faculty of Literature of Masaryk University between 1983 and 1988, and after graduating he worked as a historian in a local museum in Kroměříž.

In 1996, he became a docent at Charles University in Prague, and in 2002 was named as the first professor of political science in the Czech Republic. In 2004, he became dean of the Faculty of Social Studies at Masaryk University, and in the same year was elected as rector of the university, defeating Jan Wechsler in the third round. Fiala was reelected in 2008 and remained in the position until 2011. While Fiala was rector, Masaryk University increased its enrollment to around 45,000 students, became the most popular Czech university in terms of applications, and created a nationwide system for detecting academic plagiarism. During this period, Masaryk University built a new €220 million campus for biomedicine, opened a research station in Antarctica, and established the Central European Institute of Technology (CEITEC) using CZK 5.3 billion from the European Structural and Investment Funds. CEITEC launched in 2011.

Career

Public activism
In the 1980s, Fiala was involved in independent civic activism. Between 1984 and 1989 he participated in the so-called underground university, hosting seminars in Brno focused on political philosophy. He was involved in unofficial Christian activities, especially in the circle of secretly consecrated Bishop Stanislav Krátký. Along with other Brno students, he founded the samizdat university magazine Revue 88, published in 1988–1989.

After November 1989, he continued his publishing and civic activism, working as an editor for magazines such as Proglas, Revue Politika and Kontexty. In 1993, he founded the Centre for the Study of Democracy and Culture (CDK), a civic think-tank. Fiala was criticized for his activities during the 2021 election campaign because the centre was accepting state subsidies.

Fiala has been active for a long time in institutions and bodies related to higher education and research in the Czech Republic and abroad. He served as Vice-Chair (2005–2009) and Chair (2009–2011) of the Czech Rectors' Conference, and at the international level he was a member of the Council of the European University Association (2009–2011). In 2007, he was elected by the Parliament to the council of the Institute for the Study of Totalitarian Regimes, where he served for five years. He is a member of many scientific and academic councils of public and private universities and research institutions in the Czech Republic and abroad. He has received a number of awards for his scientific and academic work; in 2011 he was awarded the Golden Plaque of the President of the Republic.

In 2005 he was part of the commission in the competition of Czech and Moravian wines, TOP 77.

Politics

In September 2011 Fiala served as chief aide for science to Prime Minister Petr Nečas, and on 2 May 2012 was appointed as Minister of Education, Youth and Sports in Nečas's government, remaining in that post until Nečas resigned in 2013.

In the 2013 legislative election Fiala was elected as an independent to the Chamber of Deputies. The Civic Democratic Party (ODS) was defeated in the election and Fiala joined the party in November 2013. In 2014 Fiala announced his candidacy for the leadership of ODS, and on 18 January 2014 he was elected as the party's fourth leader. He was re-elected as party leader in 2016.

Fiala led ODS into the 2017 legislative election, in which the party finished second with 11% of the vote. Fiala refused to negotiate with ANO 2011 about joining the subsequent government, and ODS remained in opposition. Fiala was reelected leader of ODS in 2018. On 28 November 2017 Fiala was elected Deputy Speaker of the Chamber of Deputies, receiving 116 of 183 votes.

With Fiala as leader, ODS made gains in the 2018 municipal elections and won the Senate election of the same year. Fiala was again reelected leader of ODS in 2020.

ODS also made gains during the 2020 regional elections. Fiala then started negotiating with KDU-ČSL and TOP 09 about forming an electoral alliance for the legislative election in 2021. ODS, KDU-ČSL and TOP 09 reached an agreement to form an alliance called SPOLU ("Together"). Fiala became the alliance's candidate for the post of Prime Minister.

Ahead of the election, opinion polls suggested that ANO 2011 would win, but in an electoral upset Spolu won the highest number of votes, and opposition parties won a majority of seats in the Chamber of Deputies. The opposition parties signed a memorandum agreeing to nominate Fiala for the position of Prime Minister. On 8 November, five Czech parties, ranging from the liberal-conservative Civic Democrats to the centre-left liberal Pirate Party, signed a pact to form a new centre-right coalition government and pledged to cut budget deficits. On 9 November, President Miloš Zeman formally asked Fiala to form a new government. On 17 November 2021 Fiala introduced Zeman to his proposed cabinet and Zeman agreed to appoint Fiala the new Prime Minister on 26 November 2021. In November 2021, Fiala confirmed that he would like to continue with the Spolu coalition into the 2022 Senate and municipal elections.

Premiership
On 28 November 2021, President Miloš Zeman appointed Petr Fiala as the 13th Prime Minister of the Czech Republic. Following his appointment, Fiala said he believed his government would bring change and improve the lives of people in the Czech Republic, but that the next year would be difficult for many citizens and the Czech Republic itself. His appointment took effect upon his Cabinet being sworn in, on 17 December 2021. Fiala's government won a confidence vote in the Chamber of Deputies of the Czech Republic on 13 January 2022 by 106–86.

During the 2022 Russian invasion of Ukraine, Petr Fiala and his government took a tough stance on Russia, pushing for the toughest sanctions against Russia and supporting Ukraine's accession to the European Union. After the invasion, the Czech Republic immediately began supplying weapons and humanitarian aid to Ukraine. On 15 March 2022, Fiala, together with Polish Prime Minister Mateusz Morawiecki and Slovenian Prime Minister Janez Janša, visited Kyiv to meet with Ukrainian President Volodymyr Zelenskyy in a display of support for Ukraine. The train journey, described by the media as a "risky mission", as well as an "extraordinary attempt to demonstrate support", was the first visit by foreign leaders to Kyiv since the start of the Russian invasion, and was hailed by President Zelenskyy as a "great, brave, correct and sincere step" after the meeting.

In July 2022, he officially accepted the Presidency of the Council of the European Union on behalf of the Czech Republic. He delivered a speech on the floor of the European Parliament, in which he called for the defense of European values, continuing support for Ukraine, and the inclusion of nuclear energy as a renewable resource (which was subsequently approved by a vote from MEPs). The Presidency of the Council under Fiala was considered to have "achieved historic results", as stated by the First Vice-President of the European Commission Frans Timmermans. On 6 October 2022, Fiala chaired the 1st European Political Community Summit in Prague.

Political views

A conservative, he holds soft Eurosceptic views, and opposes political extremism and populism. He opposes same-sex marriage as he stated in his book.

In August 2016, Fiala stated that "radical Islam is at war with Europe" and that the European Union should not accept migrants who pose a risk. He opposed the withdrawal of Czech soldiers from the war in Afghanistan. Fiala expressed opposition to Russian and Chinese involvement in the construction of the new unit of the Dukovany Nuclear Power Plant. He also claimed that human impact on climate change is "not entirely clear", which was met with criticism and accusations of populism from environmental experts.

At the beginning of June 2020, a statue in Prague of the British Prime Minister Winston Churchill, in Winston Churchill Square in Žižkov, was spray-painted with the inscription "He was a racist. Black Lives Matter," referring to a wave of protests against police brutality and racism triggered by the murder of George Floyd in the United States. Fiala condemned the vandalism of Churchill's statue, describing Churchill as "the great democratic politician ... who contributed to the defeat of Adolf Hitler," and criticised the graffiti as "stupid and shameful."

Prior to the 2021 election, Fiala criticised the European Green Deal, a political initiative of the European Commission to promote the transition to a green economy. However, he wrote in May 2021, "The Green Deal is reality. There is no point in speculating how it could be otherwise. Now we must seize the opportunity to modernize the Czech economy and improve the quality of life by investing in sustainable development, renewable resources and the circular economy."

Fiala also serves as the chairman of the board of directors of the independent liberal-conservative think tank Pravý břeh.

Foreign issues

In October 2015, Fiala called for a military invasion by Western ground forces in the Middle East, stating, "We will not solve the problem of migration and destabilization of the Middle East and North Africa unless we take military action." On the other hand, he opposed Russian involvement in the war against Islamic State.

In June 2018, commemorating displaced peoples and refugees, German Chancellor Angela Merkel condemned the expulsion of Germans from Czechoslovakia and other Central and Eastern European countries after World War II, arguing that there was no moral and political justification for the expulsion. Fiala responded that "pulling things out of the past with a one-sided interpretation certainly does not help the development of mutual relations."

In October 2019, he condemned the military aggression of Turkey, a NATO member state, against the Kurds in Rojava in northern Syria, stating that "the situation in the Middle East has deteriorated significantly since this Turkish military operation in northern Syria."

He welcomed the victory of the ruling Law and Justice in the Polish parliamentary elections in October 2019, noting that ODS and PiS had been cooperating for a long time in a common European Parliament group. He also stated that he would limit the negative impacts of mining on Czech territory in the Polish Turów brown coal mine near the Czech border.

Fiala supports Israel and its policies. He criticized Foreign Minister Tomáš Petříček, Minister of Culture Lubomír Zaorálek and former Foreign Minister Karel Schwarzenberg for their joint statement on 23 May 2020 condemning the planned Israeli annexation of Jewish settlements that Israel had built in the occupied West Bank since 1967.

In 2020, he supported the official visit of Czech Senate President Miloš Vystrčil and other Czech senators to Taiwan to express support for the country and its democracy.

Personal life
Petr Fiala is married to biologist Jana Fialová, whom he met as a student during the Velvet Revolution. They have three children. Fiala is a Roman Catholic and was baptized in 1986. He played football until the age of 40 and also enjoys tennis, shooting, skiing, swimming, jazz music and James Bond movies.

Honours and awards
:
2010: Brno University of Technology awarded Fiala the Golden Medal of VUT for his cooperation with the university.
28 January 2011: Rector of Masaryk University Mikuláš Bek awarded Fiala the Golden Medal of Masaryk University for Fiala's previous work as the University's Rector.
26 August 2011: Václav Klaus awarded Fiala the Golden Plaque of the President of the Republic for his work as a Rector of Masaryk University. Fiala was the first Rector to receive the award.
2022: Fiala was awarded the University of Ostrava Award for Freedom, Democracy, Bravery and Humanity after his visit to Kyiv during the 2022 Russian invasion of Ukraine.
:
2002: Fiala was awarded the Jean Monnet Chair in European Political Integration.
:
2022 Fiala was awarded the Man of the Year Award at the opening of the 31st Economic Forum in Karpacz.
:
2022 Fiala was awarded the Order of Prince Yaroslav the Wise I degree by the President of Ukraine Volodymyr Zelenskyy.

Bibliography
Fiala, P.: Katolicismus a politika. Brno 1995. .
Fiala, P.: Německá politologie. Brno 1995. .
Fiala, P. (ed.): Politický extremismus a radikalismus v České republice. Brno 1998. .
Fiala, P. – Strmiska, M.: Teorie politických stran. Brno 1998. .
Fiala, P. – Hanuš, J.: Skrytá církev. Brno 1999. .
Fiala, P. – Hanuš, J. (eds.): Koncil a česká společnost. Brno 2000. .
Fiala, P. – Mikš, F. (eds.): Česká konzervativní a liberální politika. Brno 2000. .
Fiala, P. – Schubert, K.: Moderní analýza politiky. Brno 2000. . 
Fiala, P. – Pitrová, M. (eds.): Rozšiřování ES/EU. Brno 2001. .
Fiala, P. – Hanuš, J. (eds.): Katolická církev a totalitarismus v českých zemích. Brno 2001. .
Fiala, P. – Holzer, J. – Strmiska, M. (eds.): Politické strany ve střední a východní Evropě. Brno 2002. .
Fiala, P. – Herbut, R. (eds.): Středoevropské systémy politických stran. Brno 2003. .
Fiala, P. – Pitrová, M.: Evropská unie. Brno 2003. ; 2. dopl. a aktual. vyd. 2009. .
Antoszewski, A. – Fiala, P. – Herbut, R. – Sroka, J. (eds.): Partie i systemy partyjne Europy Środkowej. Wroclaw 2003. .
Fiala, P. – Hanuš, J.: Die Verborgene Kirche. Paderborn 2004. .
Fiala, P. – Hanuš, J. – Vybíral, J. (eds.): Katolická sociální nauka a současná věda. Brno, Praha 2004. .
Dančák, B. – Fiala, P. – Hloušek, V. (eds.): Evropeizace. Brno 2005. .
Dočkal, V. – Fiala, P. – Pitrová, M. – Kaniok, P. (eds.): Česká politika v Evropské unii. Brno 2006. .
Fiala, P. – Mareš, M. – Sokol, P.: Eurostrany. Brno 2007. .
Fiala, P.: Laboratoř sekularizace. Brno 2007. .
Fiala, P.: Evropský mezičas. Brno 2007. ; 2. aktualizované a rozšířené vydání 2010. .
Fiala, P. – Foral, J. – Konečný, K. – Marek, P. – Pehr, M. – Trapl, M. (eds.): Český politický katolicismus 1848–2005. Brno 2008. .
Fiala, P. a kol. (ed.): Evropeizace zájmů. Brno 2009. .
Balík, S. – Císař, O. – Fiala, P. (eds.): Veřejné politiky v České republice v letech 1989–2009. Brno 2010. 
Fiala, P.: Politika, jaká nemá být. Brno 2010. .
Fiala, P.: Na konci bezstarostnosti. Brno 2015. .
Fiala, P.: Občané, demokraté a straníci. Brno 2015. .
Balaštík M., Fiala P.: Profesor na frontové linii: Rozhovor Miroslava Balaštíka. Brno 2017. ISBN 978-80-7485-124-7.
Fiala, P.: Rozum a odvaha. Brno 2017. .
Balík, S. – Fiala, P. – Hanuš, J. – Mikš, F.: Manifest čtyř: Program pro přátele svobody. Brno 2017. ISBN 978-80-7485-135-3.
Fiala, P. – Hanuš, J.: Vraťme politice smysl! Rozhovory s Jiřím Hanušem. Brno 2017. ISBN 978-80-7485-136-0.
Fiala, P.: Jak uvařit demokracii: Od vládní agonie k polokomunistické vládě. Brno 2017. ISBN 978-80-7485-168-1.
Fiala, P. – Mikš, F.: Konzervatismus dnes: Politika, společnost a zdravý rozum v době nerozumu. Brno 2019. ISBN 978-80-7485-186-5.
Fiala, P. – Mikš, F. (eds.): Listopad 1989 včera a dnes: Mánesovská setkávání. Brno 2019. 
Fiala P.: [M]UNIVERZITA: Poslání, výzvy a proměny ve 21. století. Brno 2019. ISBN 978-80-7485-184-1.
Fiala, P. – Dvořák, P. – Krutílek, O.: Politika v čase koronaviru: Předběžná analýza. Brno 2020. ISBN 978-80-7485-209-1.

See also
List of prime ministers of the Czech Republic

References

External links

Official website
Government website profile

|-

|-

|-

|-

1964 births
Living people
Politicians from Brno
Prime Ministers of the Czech Republic
Education ministers of the Czech Republic
Leaders of the Civic Democratic Party (Czech Republic)
Masaryk University alumni
Academic staff of Charles University
Civic Democratic Party (Czech Republic) prime ministers
Civic Democratic Party (Czech Republic) MPs
Czech political scientists
Members of the Chamber of Deputies of the Czech Republic (2017–2021)
Members of the Chamber of Deputies of the Czech Republic (2013–2017)
Academic staff of Masaryk University
Czechoslovak dissidents
Czech Roman Catholics
Members of the Chamber of Deputies of the Czech Republic (2021–2025)
21st-century Czech politicians
Rectors of universities in the Czech Republic
Recipients of the Order of Prince Yaroslav the Wise, 1st class